Rio Frio or Río Frío or Frio River (English: Cold River) may refer to:

Rivers
 Frío River (Costa Rica)
 Frío River (Puerto Rico)
 Frio River, Texas
 Río Frío (Bogotá), a tributary of the Bogotá River, Colombia
 Río Frío, a tributary of the Palena River, Chile

Settlements
 Rio Frio (Bragança), a parish in the municipality of Bragança, Portugal
 Rio Frio, Alberta, Canada
 Rio Frio, Texas, an unincorporated community in Real County, Texas, USA
 Río Frío de Juárez, a village in Mexico

Other uses
 Río Frío Airport, Río Frío, Chile
 Río Frío (Mexico City Metrobús), a BRT station in Mexico City

See also
Frio (disambiguation)
Riofrío (disambiguation)